The Avalanche   is a 1946 Czechoslovak crime film, directed by Miroslav Cikán. It stars  Otomar Korbelář, Marie Glázrová, Helena Bušová.

Cast 
Otomar Korbelář as JUDr. Karel Heran
Marie Glázrová as Irena Malíková
Helena Bušová as Olga
Jaroslav Průcha as Ptácek, policejní inspektor
Jaroslav Marvan as Dr. Urban, policejní rada
Dana Medřická as Bendová, kvetinárka
Jiří Dohnal as Pavel Benda
Eduard Kohout as Dr. Malík
Vladimír Repa as Lékar

References

External links
The Avalanche  at the Internet Movie Database

1946 films
Czechoslovak crime films
1946 crime films
Films directed by Miroslav Cikán
Czech crime films
Czechoslovak black-and-white films
Avalanches in film
1940s Czech films